The Slab Fork is a tributary of the Guyandotte River,  long, in southern West Virginia in the United States.

Between Slab Fork and Mullens, the stream is paralleled by West Virginia Route 54.

According to 1992 data from the United States Geological Survey, approximately 95% of the Slab Fork watershed was forested; approximately 2% was used for agriculture; and approximately 1% was used for commercial or mining purposes.

See also
List of rivers of West Virginia

References 

Rivers of West Virginia
Tributaries of the Guyandotte River
Rivers of Raleigh County, West Virginia
Rivers of Wyoming County, West Virginia